Stomatosuchus (type species S. inermis) is an extinct stomatosuchid neosuchian from the Late Cretaceous (Cenomanian) of Egypt. Much of what is known about Stomatosuchus has been inferred from the related genus Laganosuchus.

Description 
The mandible may have been toothless and perhaps even supported a pelican-like throat pouch. This pouch however could have been used to scoop up fish and sharks much like a modern day pelican, the conical teeth would prevent the prey for escaping. Due to such a bizarre skull structure, much about the diet of S. inermis remains unknown.

The only known specimen of S. inermis consisted of a partial skull and two caudal vertebrae. It was collected in Egypt during 1911 by the German paleontologist Ernst Stromer whilst on an expedition. It was delivered to the Munich Museum, which was later destroyed by an Allied bombing raid in 1944. Currently, only photographs of the specimen remain.

Habitat 
It is likely that S. inermis lived in the marshy lowlands of what is now the Eastern Sahara Desert. It may have populated the entirety of Northern Africa but due to the only fossil evidence of the species being destroyed and no other bones having been found since, it is impossible to establish an exact range.

Gallery

References

Late Cretaceous crocodylomorphs of Africa
Bahariya Formation
Cenomanian genera
Taxa named by Ernst Stromer
Fossil taxa described in 1925
Prehistoric marine crocodylomorphs
Prehistoric pseudosuchian genera
Cretaceous Egypt